Bauchioceras is an extinct genus of cephalopod belonging to the Ammonite subclass.

Distribution
Cretaceous of Nigeria

References

Cretaceous ammonites
Cretaceous animals of Africa
Turonian life